Kinelle is a rural locality (a settlement) in Kilinchinsky Selsoviet, Privolzhsky District, Astrakhan Oblast, Russia. The population was 96 as of 2010. There are 2 streets.

Geography 
Kinelle is located 25 km south of Nachalovo (the district's administrative centre) by road. Yevpraksino is the nearest rural locality.

References 

Rural localities in Privolzhsky District, Astrakhan Oblast